The Regional Series is a professional cricket league in Scotland. It is Scotland's premier domestic competition for the most talented cricketers in the country. The series was first contested in 2016 replaced the North Sea Pro Series a competition which was a joint venture between the Royal Dutch Cricket Board and Cricket Scotland. The competition is sponsored by Tilney. The Regional Pro Series comprises a 50-over tournament, the Tilney Pro50 and a 20-over tournament the Tilney T20 Blitz.

The tournament consists of three teams; Western Warriors, Eastern Knights and Caledonian Highlanders. Each team is based in a different region of Scotland and has representative teams throughout youth age groups. Eastern Knights are the defending champion in both 50 over and T20 competitions.

Teams

Squads (2019)

See also

 Cricket in Scotland
 Scottish National Cricket League
 Murgitroyd T20
 North Sea Pro Series
 Strathmore & Perthshire Cricket Union
 Strathmore Union

References

External links
Regional Pro Series, Cricket Scotland

Scottish domestic cricket competitions
2016 establishments in Scotland
2016 in Scottish cricket
Recurring sporting events established in 2016
Sports competitions in Scotland
Professional cricket leagues
Professional sports leagues in the United Kingdom